Ithamara Koorax (born April 28, 1965) is a Brazilian jazz and pop singer.

Early life 
She was born to a family of Polish Jews who fled Europe during World War II. In her youth Koorax studied piano, opera, and classical music while listening to her parents' collection of Tony Bennett, Frank Sinatra, Ella Fitzgerald, Dave Brubeck, George Shearing, and Teddy Wilson. For influences she has cited Elizete Cardoso, Elis Regina, Betty Carter, Carmen McRae, and Flora Purim, particularly Purim's album Stories to Tell, which inspired her choice of careers. 

When she was eighteen years old, she worked as a backup singer for commercials and for pop stars in Brazil. Among those artists were Tim Maia and Vicente Viola.

Career
She has recorded solo albums for the IRMA, Milestone, Mercury, EMI, JVC, King, Huks and Motéma labels, besides fourteen soundtracks for movies and TV series, and also took part in more than 200 special projects and compilations.

Koorax has worked with Antonio Carlos Jobim, Luiz Bonfa, Ron Carter, Larry Coryell, Elizeth Cardoso, Gonzalo Rubalcaba, John McLaughlin, Sadao Watanabe, Hermeto Pascoal, Marcos Valle, Peter Scharli, Jay Berliner, Edu Lobo, Martinho da Vila, Jürgen Friedrich, Claus Ogerman, Dave Brubeck, João Donato, Dom Um Romão, Thiago de Mello, Mario Castro-Neves, Raul de Souza, Chris Conway, Eumir Deodato, Lou Volpe, Laudir de Oliveira, Rodgers Grant, Gil Goldstein, Art Farmer, Eddie Gomez, the groups Azymuth, Gazzara and Os Cariocas, the big bands Amazon and Rio Jazz Orchestra, and the Symphony Orchestras "Petrobras" and "Jazz Sinfonica".

From 1990 to 2003, Koorax record over 10 songs for the soundtracks of Brazilian TV soap operas such as Riacho Doce (1990), Araponga (1991), Pedra Sobre Pedra (1992), Renascer (1993), Fera Ferida (1994), Cara & Cora (1995), Estrela Guia (2001, singing the main theme, "Cristal", which became a radio hit in Brazil) and Celebridade (2003, for which she recorded a previously unreleased song written by Antonio Carlos Jobim, "Absolut Lee"), and O Rico e O Lázaro (2019), among others.

Koorax also recorded the soundtracks for four films directed by movie director Silvio Tendler: Glauber, O Filme - Labirinto do Brasil (2003), JK - O Menino Que Sonhou Um País (2002), Tzedaká - 80 Anos do Froein Farain (2003), Marighella - Retrato Falado do Guerilheiro (2001). Koorax also sings on the soundtracks of Mãos de Afeto (1990, directed by Gilberto Gouma), Policarpo Quaresma - Herói do Brasil (1997, directed by Paulo Thiago), and Apenas Meninas (2021), directed by Bianca Lenti for HBO.

Koorax's debut solo album, "Luiza - Live In Rio" was recorded in 1993, followed by "Rio Vermelho" (1995), which features Antonio Carlos Jobim, Luiz Bonfa, Marcos Valle, Ron Carter, Sadao Watanabe. Her third album was a collaboration project with Luiz Bonfa, "Almost In Love - Ithamara Koorax Sings The Luiz Bonfá Songbook" (1996), featuring Bonfa himself on guitar plus special guests Eumir Deodato, Larry Coryell, Sadao Watanabe, Torcuato Mariano. 

"Wave 2001" (1997) was recorded in Tokyo, with Japanese musicians such as Tomonao Hara and Eijiro Nakagawa, during an Asian tour the previous year. It was followed by "Bossa Nova Meets Drum 'N' Bass" (1998), recorded in New York.

Koorax signed a deal with Milestone Records in 2000 and released two albums produced by Arnaldo DeSouteiro for the San Francisco-based label: "Serenade In Blue" (2001, featuring Gonzalo Rubalcaba, Azymuth, Eumir Deodato, Jay Berliner, Marcos Valle) and "Love Dance" (2003, with John McLaughlin, Dom Um Romão, João Palma, Marcos Valle, Jurgen Friedrich, Azymuth).

In 2009, "Bim Bom - The Complete Joao Gilberto Songbook," a duo session with guitarist Juarez Moreira, received rave reviews in the New York Times, Cashbox, Billboard, Jazz Hot, Jazz 'n' More, All Music Guide, and many other magazines, websites and newspapers.

Another CD, "O Grande Amor," recorded during a European tour with the Peter Schärli Trio in 2010, was also released with critical acclaim, receiving a 4 and 1/2 star review in the May 2011 issue of DownBeat magazine and 5-star ratings in several other magazines like Jazz 'n' More. Later on, O Grande Amor was elected one of the "Best CDs of 2011" in the January 2012 issue of DownBeat.

Ithamara Koorax has performed in the USA, Japan, Korea and many European countries (England, France, Germany, Switzerland, Czech Republic, Finland, Bulgaria, Serbia, Portugal etc.), appearing at jazz festivals in London, Seoul, Belgrade, Funchal, Helsinki, Indijja and many other cities. Koorax has also performed classical and fusion concerts backed by Symphony Orchestras.

Her recordings have been remixed by DJs from all over the world. Among them: Tom Novy, Parov Stelar, Cargo, Tetsu Shibuya/Brisa. During 2010, Ithamara performed 47 concerts in Brazil and 51 abroad, having toured Europe and Asia. 

Koorax's jazz-pop album "Got to Be Real," produced and arranged by Arnaldo DeSouteiro, was released worldwide in March 2012 by IRMA Records, with critical acclaim and immediate sales.

A bossa nova album, "The Girl from Ipanema - Ithamara Koorax Sings Getz/Gilberto," on which she revisited the material from the legendary album "Getz/Gilberto" (1964) recorded by Stan Getz and João Gilberto, and the dance-oriented electronic project "Ecstasy," were also released in 2013.

Koorax has performed in the U.S., Japan, Korea and many European countries (England, France, Germany, Switzerland, Czech Republic, Finland, Bulgaria, Serbia, Portugal), appearing at jazz festivals in London, Seoul, Belgrade, Funchal, Helsinki, and Indijja. She has performed classical and fusion concerts with symphony orchestras, appearing at the Theatro Minicipal do Rio de Janeiro (RJ) with the Petrobras Symphony and at the Ibirapuera Auditorium (São Paulo) with the Orquestra Jazz Sinfônica.

In 2010, she performed 47 concerts in Brazil and 51 abroad, having toured Europe and Asia. On tour in August 2010, she recorded Arirang with Korean pop stars, Brazilian musicians Rodrigo Lima, Arnaldo DeSouteiro and Wilson Chaplin, and American jazzmen  Lee Ritenour and  Alan Broadbent. 

Koorax's crossover classics project Opus Classico (2013) contained works by Rachmaninoff, Chopin, Wagner, Debussy, Fauré, Ravel and Brazilian composers Heitor Villa-Lobos, Delza Agricola, Chiquinha Gonzaga and Machado de Assis. Her album All Around the World (2014) was recorded live in Rio, London, Paris, Sofia, Munich, Tokyo, and Seoul, with songs by Antônio Carlos Jobim, Jorge Ben, Marvin Gaye, Herbie Hancock, and Jimi Hendrix.

Personal life 
In April 1990, Ithamara Koorax married fellow musician and producer Arnaldo DeSouteiro.

Discography 
As a leader/co-leader 
 Luiza (Victor, 1993)
 Rio Vermelho (Imagem, 1995)
 Red River (Paddle Wheel, 1995)
 Ithamara Koorax Sings the Luiz Bonfa Songbook with Luiz Bonfa (Paddle Wheel, 1996)
 Wave 2001 (Paddle Wheel, 1997)
 Almost in Love (Imagem, 1997)
 Bossa Nova Meets Drum and Bass (Paddle Wheel, 1998)
 Serenade in Blue (Milestone, 2000)
 Cry Me a River (Huks, 2001)
 Someday (Huks, 2002)
 Amor Sem Adeus: The Luiz Bonfa Songbook (Huks, 2002)
 Love Dance: The Ballad Album (Milestone, 2003)
 Autumn in New York with Jurgen Friedrich (JSR/EMI 2004)
 Brazilian Butterfly (Irma, 2006)
 Tributo a Stellinha Egg (CEDEM, 2007)
 Obrigado Dom Um Romão" with the Peter Scharli Trio (TCB, 2008)
 Bim Bom: The Complete Joao Gilberto Songbook with Juarez Moreira (Motema, 2009)
 O Grande Amor with Peter Scharli (TCB, 2010)
 Got to Be Real (Irma, 2012)
 Opus Classico (Arte Nova, 2013)
 Ecstasy (Jazz Vision, 2013)
 Ithamara Koorax Sings Getz/Gilberto (Jazz Vision, 2013)
 All Around the World (Jazz Vision, 2014)
 Sings the Jazz Masters (Jazz Vision, 2017)
 60 Years of Bossa Nova'' (Jazz Vision, 2018)

As a special guest
 David Calderoni "Dear Mom Beija-Flor" (Tratore, 2022)
 Jorge Pescara "Grooves In The Eden" (JSR/Tratore, 2018)
 Rodrigo Lima "Saga" (JSR, 2014)
 Chris Conway "Through Mirrors We Met" (Aloft, 2014)
 Cesar Machado "Made For US" (Acoustic Music, 2014)
 Antenor Bogea "Renaitre" (EMSE, 2013)
 Mario Conde "Guitarra Brasil Universo" (Gramofone, 2011)
 Chris Conway "Chocolate Bossa" (Oblong Music, 2007)
 Thiago de Mello and Dexter Payne "Another Feeling" (Dexofon, 2007)
 Gazzara "Brother And Sister" (Halidon, 2006)
 Thiago de Mello "Amor Mai-Que-Perfeito" (Ethos Brasil, 2006)
 Marcelo Salazar "Tropical Lounge Project" (JSR, 2005)
 Jorge Pescara "Grooves In The Temple" (JSR/Tratore, 2005)
 Mario Castro-Neves "On A Clear Bossa Day" (JSR/Rambling, 2004)
 Dom Um Romão "Nu Jazz Meets Brazil" (JSR/IRMA, 2003) 
 Carlos Pingarilho "Histórias E Sonhos" (JSR, 2003)
 Brazil All-Stars "Rio Strut" (Milestone, 2002)
 Dom Um Romão "Lake of Perseverance" (JSR/IRMA, 2001)
 JSR All-Stars "Friends From Brazil 2001" (IRMA, 2001)
 Paula Faour "Cool Bossa Struttin'" (JSR/Paddle Wheel, 2001)
 Orquestra Petrobrás Pró-Música" (OPPM, 1998)
 Dom Um Romão "Rhythm Traveller" (JSR/Mr. Bongo, 1998)
 Marcos Valle "Songbook Marcos Valle, Vol. 1" (Lumiar, 1998)
 Elizeth Cardoso "Ary Amoroso" (Sony, 1990)

References

External links 
 Official web site www.koorax.com

1965 births
Living people
Brazilian jazz musicians
Brazilian Jews
21st-century Brazilian women singers
21st-century Brazilian singers
Brazilian people of Polish-Jewish descent
Milestone Records artists
Jewish jazz musicians
Motéma Music artists
20th-century Brazilian women singers
20th-century Brazilian singers